Horaga syrinx, the yellow onyx, is  a species of lycaenid or hairstreak butterfly found in Asia.

Range
H. syrinx is found in northern India, Malaya, Indonesia, Philippines, Sulawesi, the Moluccas and New Guinea

See also
List of butterflies of India
List of butterflies of India (Lycaenidae)

Cited references

Horaga
Butterflies of Singapore
Butterflies described in 1860